Vasanthavada  is a village in the Atreyapuram Mandal in the East Godavari District of Andhra Pradesh State in the Republic of India.

References

Villages in East Godavari district